Buzzards Bay is a bay of the Atlantic Ocean adjacent to the U.S. state of Massachusetts. It is approximately 28 miles (45 kilometers) long by 8 miles (12 kilometers) wide.  It is a popular destination for fishing, boating, and tourism. Since 1914, Buzzards Bay has been connected to Cape Cod Bay by the Cape Cod Canal. In 1988, under the Clean Water Act, the Environmental Protection Agency and the Commonwealth of Massachusetts designated Buzzards Bay to the National Estuary Program, as "an estuary of national significance" that is threatened by pollution, land development, or overuse.

Geography
It is surrounded by the Elizabeth Islands on the south, by Cape Cod on the east, and the southern coasts of Bristol and Plymouth counties in Massachusetts to the northwest. To the southwest, the bay is connected to Rhode Island Sound. The city of New Bedford, Massachusetts is a historically significant port on Buzzards Bay; the Port of New Bedford the world's most successful whaling port during the early- and mid-19th century, and has been the nation's most productive fishing port for the last several years.

Geology
Buzzards Bay was created during the latter portion of the Pleistocene epoch through the interplay of glacial and oceanic processes. Beginning fifty thousand to seventy thousand years ago, the edges of the continental ice sheet covering much of North America began to fluctuate, leaving moraines to mark the former extent of the receded ice. One such moraine forms Cape Cod, which is  most of the eastern shoreline of Buzzards Bay.

In addition to the moraines, the melting ice sheet produced extensive outwash plains composed of mixed sediments and ice that bordered the bay to the northwest and west. Melting ice blocks in the outwash deposits formed distinctive circular features called kettle lakes. Numerous examples of kettle lakes can be found to the northwest of the Cape Cod Canal. Finally, waters released from the melting ice sheet raised sea level by sixty to one-hundred-twenty meters (198–396 feet) and drowned preexisting outwash channels. Toward the end of the last ice age, fifteen thousand years ago until about six thousand years ago, Buzzards Bay was still dry land. During the past six thousand years, sea level has risen an average of one foot per century, and until about four thousand years ago, the landward boundary of Buzzards Bay extended only to about the current thirty-foot bathymetric contour, forming a coastline two-thirds of the way up the current bay, between West Falmouth and Mattapoisett.

The bay's current configuration, a well-mixed central bay and fringing shallow drowned-river valleys, with their shallow depth, tidal action, and surface waves, promotes mixing of the estuarine waters to create a productive aquatic ecosystem. Like many estuaries, however, increasing development and land-use changes by the surrounding communities are accompanied by nutrient runoff leading to eutrophication (an increase in nutrient levels leading to oxygen depletion) in the smaller embayments. Decreases in eelgrass, scallops, and herring have also been noted, but direct cause-and-effect relationships are not clear. Coordinated management efforts in Buzzards Bay have helped to decrease shellfish closures, conserve habitat for sea birds, and preserve open space.

History

Buzzards Bay was first named Gosnold's Hope by Captain Bartholomew Gosnold. The modern name was presumably given by colonists who saw a large bird that they called a buzzard near its shores. The bird was actually an osprey. After a downturn caused by DDT, today increasing numbers of osprey breed along the shores of the bay thanks to restoration efforts led by the Buzzards Bay Coalition and longtime Westport residents Gil and Josephine Fernandez.

The first naval engagement of the American Revolution, the Battle off Fairhaven, occurred in Buzzards Bay when patriots retrieved two vessels that were captured by the British sloop of war Falcon.  On 14 May 1775, American Captain Daniel Egery and Capt. Nathaniel Pope of Fairhaven in the sloop Success (40 tons, 30 men) retrieved two vessels captured by the British crew of Captain John Linzee (Lindsey), Royal Navy commander of HMS Falcon (14 guns, 110 men).  Crew member Noah Stoddard and the others took the first naval prisoners of the war, 13 British crew; two were wounded and one died.

The bay was the location, in 1936, of one of only five documented fatal shark attacks in the commonwealth's history.

In 1987, researchers from the Woods Hole Oceanographic Institution experimented with a new growth structure allowing Blue mussels to grow above the Benthic Turbidity Zone leading to a new commercial scale mariculture technique.

In 1991, towns located on Buzzards Bay suffered the worst effects from the storm surge of Hurricane Bob.

The Buzzards Bay disaster happened on April 27, 2003. An oil spill of 98,000 gallons of oil leaked from a barge, destroying much of the shellfish business and killing many birds.

Ra Ra Riot's John Pike's body was found in Buzzard's Bay. He had disappeared from a party in Fairhaven, Massachusetts in June 2007, and was found several weeks later in the bay.

On January 7, 2018, due to the 2017–18 North American cold wave, part of the bay froze over.

Islands
 Amrita Island
 Bassetts Island
 Bird Island
 Elizabeth Islands
 Bachelor Island
 Baret Island
 Cuttyhunk Island
 Nashawena Island
 Naushon Island
 Nonamesset Island
 Pasque Island
 Penikese Island
 Uncatena Island
 Veckatimest Island
 Weepecket Islands
 Gull Island
 Monohansett Island
 Onset Island
 West Island
 Wickets Island

See also 
 List of islands of Massachusetts for a more-or-less complete listing of the islets, rocks, and ledges within the bay.

References

Further reading
 
 High-resolution Geophysical Data from the Inner Continental Shelf: Buzzards Bay, Massachusetts United States Geological Survey

External links
 The Buzzards Bay watershed.
 The Buzzards Bay National Estuary Program.
 1906 Bird's Eye View of Buzzards Bay
 Buzzards Bay Coalition
 Sailing Buzzards Bay: Photographs

Estuaries of Massachusetts
Estuaries of Barnstable County, Massachusetts
Bays of Massachusetts
Massachusetts natural resources
Intracoastal Waterway
Bodies of water of Barnstable County, Massachusetts
Bodies of water of Bristol County, Massachusetts
Bodies of water of Dukes County, Massachusetts
Bays of Plymouth County, Massachusetts